Nirmal Singh may refer to:
 Nirmal Singh (Shutrana politician) from INC in Punjab, India
 Nirmal Singh Khalsa (1952–2020), Sikh Hazoori Ragi of Darbar Sahib
 Nirmal Singh (judge) (born 1947), MLA of Bassi Pathana
 Nirmal Kumar Singh (born 1956), BJP politician and deputy chief minister of Jammu and Kashmir
 Nirmal Singh (Haryana) (born 1953), Congress politician from Haryana